The Asian Women's Club League Handball Championship, organized by the Asian Handball Federation, is the official competition for women's handball clubs of Asia crowning the Asian champions.

Summary

Medal table (clubs) (2016-2022)

Medals (countries) (2016-2022)

References

External links
 Asian Women's Club League Handball Championship Official website

Asian Handball Championships
Recurring sporting events established in 2016
Multi-national professional sports leagues
2016 establishments in Asia